The Forestville Historic District is a national historic district located at Forestville, Shenandoah County, Virginia.  The district encompasses 84 contributing buildings, 4 contributing sites, and 1 contributing structure in the 19th century mill village of Forestville.  The vernacular buildings represent a variety of popular architectural styles including Greek Revival, Queen Anne, and Italianate.  The buildings date from the late-18th to mid-20th centuries and primarily include log and wood-frame single dwellings, with domestic and agricultural dependencies, that dominate the district are substantiated by a gristmill, two commercial buildings.  Also in the district are a church, a cemetery, a post office, two doctors' offices, and a school.

It was listed on the National Register of Historic Places in 2011.

References

Historic districts on the National Register of Historic Places in Virginia
Greek Revival architecture in Virginia
Queen Anne architecture in Virginia
Italianate architecture in Virginia
Buildings and structures in Shenandoah County, Virginia
National Register of Historic Places in Shenandoah County, Virginia